Becton is a surname. Notable people with the surname include:

Charles Becton, attorney, former judge and president of the North Carolina Bar Association
Frank Becton (born 1873), English professional footballer
Frederick J. Becton (1908–1995), United States Navy rear admiral
George Wilson Becton (died 1933), African-American preacher
Julius W. Becton Jr. (born 1926), retired United States Army lieutenant general
Maxwell Becton (1868–1951), co-founded Becton Dickinson, an American medical equipment manufacturing company, in 1897
Mekhi Becton (born 1999), American football player
Nick Becton (born 1990), American National Football League player
Tommy Becton (1878–1957), former professional footballer